His Forgotten Wife is a 1924 American silent drama film directed by William A. Seiter and starring Warner Baxter, Madge Bellamy, and Tom Guise.

Plot
As described in a film magazine review, Donald Allen is reported killed in France during the war. His fiancee, Corinne McRea, inherits his property. Donald, a victim of lost memory through shock, returns to America married to his French nurse, Suzanne, under the name of John Rolfe. They both obtain jobs as servants at Donald's home. He is recognized by the estate trustee. Corinne attempts to escape with the bank roll, but is foiled by Suzanne. An operation restores Donald's memory of his old life, but he temporarily forgets Suzanne. However, he regains his lost consciousness in time to know his wife and all ends well.

Cast
 Warner Baxter as Donald Allen / John Rolfe
 Madge Bellamy as Suzanne
 Tom Guise as Judge Henry
 Hazel Keener as Irene Humphrey
 Willis Marks as Meadows
 Eric Mayne as French Major
 Maude Wayne as Corinne McRea

References

Bibliography
 Munden, Kenneth White. The American Film Institute Catalog of Motion Pictures Produced in the United States, Part 1. University of California Press, 1997.

External links
 

1924 films
1924 drama films
1920s English-language films
American silent feature films
Silent American drama films
American black-and-white films
Films directed by William A. Seiter
Film Booking Offices of America films
1920s American films